Bruno Burrini (22 November 1931 – 3 April 2017) was an Italian alpine skier. He competed in three events at the 1956 Winter Olympics.

References

External links
 

1931 births
2017 deaths
Italian male alpine skiers
Olympic alpine skiers of Italy
Alpine skiers at the 1956 Winter Olympics